Paloma Díaz-Mas (born 1954) is a Spanish writer and scholar.

She was born in Madrid and studied journalism and philology at university. In 1981, she obtained her doctorate from the Universidad Complutense de Madrid, with a thesis on the subject of Sephardic poetry. At present, she teaches and conducts research at the Consejo Superior de Investigaciones Científicas  (CSIC) in Madrid. As a professor of Spanish literature and Sephardic literature, she has taught at the Universidad del País Vasco, the University of Oregon and Washington University in St. Louis.
 
She published her first book at 19, a collection of short fictitious lives called Biografías de genios, traidores, sabios y suicidas. Ten years later, she wrote her only play till date, La informante, which won the Premio Teatro Breve Rojas Zorrilla in 1983. The same year, she published her first novel El rapto del Santo Grial, based on the tale of the Arthurian legend of the Holy Grail. The book was nominated for the Premio Herralde, which also made its debut that year.

She followed up with books such as Tras las huellas de Artorius, Nuestro milenio, El sueño de Venecia (winner of the Premio Herralde in 1992), and La tierra fertil (winner of the Premio Euskadi in 2000).

Her 1992 book Una ciudad llamada Eugenio relates the story of her stay in Eugene, Oregon where she was visiting professor at the local university. Recent books include Como un libro cerrado (2005) and Lo que aprendemos de los gatos (2014). She is also the author of scholarly works such as Los sefardíes: Historia, lengua, cultura (1986) which was a finalist for the Premio Nacional de Ensayo.

In April 2021, she was elected as numerary member of the Royal Spanish Academy, intended to occupy the vacant 'i' seat left by Margarita Salas.

Selected works
 Biografías de genios, traidores, sabios y suicidas. Madrid: Editora Nacional, 1973. 
 La informante. Toledo: Ebora, 1983. Play. Winner of the Premio Teatro Breve Rojas Zorrilla 1983.
 El rapto del Santo Grial. Barcelona: Anagrama, 1984. Novel. Finalist of the first Premio Herralde 1983.
 Tras las huellas de Artorius. Cáceres: Institución Cultural El Brocense, 1985. Novel. Winner of the Premio Cáceres 1984.
 Los sefardíes: Historia, lengua, cultura. Zaragoza: Riopiedras, 1986. Essays. Finalist of the Premio Nacional de Ensayo 1986.
 Nuestro milenio. Barcelona: Anagrama, 1987. Stories. Finalist of the Premio Nacional de Narrativa 1987.
 "La discreta pecadora o ejemplo de doncellas recogidas". Short story published in: Cuentos eróticos. Laura Freixas (editor). Barcelona: Grijalbo, 1988. 
 Una ciudad llamada Eugenio. Barcelona: Anagrama, 1992. Travel.
 El sueño de Venecia. Barcelona: Anagrama, 1992. Novel. Winner of the tenth Premio Herralde 1992. 
 "La niña sin alas". Short story in Madres e hijas. Laura Freixas (editor). Barcelona: Anagrama, 1996. 
 La tierra fértil. Barcelona: Anagrama, 1999. Novel. Winner of the Premio Euskadi 2000.
 "La construcción de una escritora". Essay in En sus propias palabras. Christine Henseler(editor). Madrid: Torremozas, 2003. 
 Como un libro cerrado. Barcelona: Anagrama, 2005. Novel.
 "La visita del Comendador. Short story in Don Juan. Zaragoza: 451 Editores, 2008. 
 "Los mayorales exhaustos. Short story in Cuentos de amigas. Laura Freixas (editor). Barcelona: Anagrama, 2009. 
 Lo que aprendemos de los gatos. Barcelona: Anagrama, 2014.

References

Spanish novelists
1954 births
People from Madrid
Spanish women writers
Living people
Judaeo-Spanish
Academic staff of the University of the Basque Country
Washington University in St. Louis faculty
University of Oregon faculty